Pavandeep Singh (born 17 January 1998) is a Malaysian cricketer. He played in the 2014 ICC World Cricket League Division Three tournament. In April 2018, he was named in Malaysia's squad for the 2018 ICC World Cricket League Division Four tournament, also in Malaysia. He was the leading wicket-taker for Malaysia in the tournament, with nine dismissals in five matches.

In August 2018, he was named in Malaysia's squad for the 2018 Asia Cup Qualifier tournament. In October 2018, he was named in Malaysia's squad in the Eastern sub-region group for the 2018–19 ICC World Twenty20 Asia Qualifier tournament. On 9 October 2018, in the rain-affected match against Myanmar, he took five wickets for one run, with Myanmar finishing 9/8 from 10.1 overs.

In July 2019, he was named in Malaysia's Twenty20 International (T20I) squad for their series against Nepal. He made his T20I debut for Malaysia against Nepal on 13 July 2019. In September 2019, he was named in Malaysia's squad for the 2019 Malaysia Cricket World Cup Challenge League A tournament. He made his List A debut for Malaysia, against Denmark, in the Cricket World Cup Challenge League A tournament on 16 September 2019.

References

External links
 

1998 births
Living people
Malaysian cricketers
Malaysia Twenty20 International cricketers
Place of birth missing (living people)
Malaysian people of Punjabi descent
Malaysian sportspeople of Indian descent
Cricketers at the 2014 Asian Games
Southeast Asian Games gold medalists for Malaysia
Southeast Asian Games medalists in cricket
Competitors at the 2017 Southeast Asian Games
Asian Games competitors for Malaysia